Ultra was a Dutch post-punk movement of the early 1980s.

In contrast to other countries' post-punk movements, the Dutch version experimented with, among other things, toy instruments, chainsaws and de-tuned guitars. The movement's name comes from a series of concerts held under that name between September 1980 and March 1981 in Octopus, a youth club on an Amsterdam canal.

The events were organized by Wally van Middendorp (from the band Minny Pops and the Plurex record label), Rob Scholte (from the band The Young Lions) and Harold Schellinx (from the band The Young Lions, and editor of the music magazine Vinyl) .

The movement had an explicitly artsy aesthetic, and many of its participants were educated in art schools. Ultra was somewhat allied with the "modern music magazine" Vinyl, which not only acted as a voice for the movement, but also released the music of various ultra bands on flexidisc, with every issue of the magazine accompanied by a free record.

The ultra movement was primarily centred on Amsterdam bands, although its influence was felt in the whole of the country; affiliated bands from the 'provinces' (outside of Amsterdam) included Mekanik Kommando (Nijmegen) and Nasmak (Eindhoven). The music was mostly recorded on compact cassettes, but also on vinyl. The most representative compilation of the ultra movement was the C-90 cassette Ultra, released in 1981 on the Amsterdam label "Lebel PERIOD".

Discography 
 Ultra - Octopus Amsterdam, C90 cassette (Lebel PERIOD, Amsterdam 1981)
Tox Modell - 11/04/1981 Parkhof C30 cassette (Lebel PERIOD, Amsterdam 1981)

References

	

Post-punk
1980s in music
Dutch styles of music
Punk rock genres